Bands  was in Italian military term for irregular forces, composed of natives, with Italian officers and NCOs in command. These units were employed by the Italian Army as auxiliaries to the regular national and  colonial military forces. They were also known to the British colonial forces as "armed Bands".

Characteristics
A  (singular) was approximatively company sized. The  a regimental unit appeared briefly during the fascist period in the Balkans. The first of these irregular units employed by the  originated from a mercenary Arab force employed by the Ottoman Empire, called Bashi-bazouk (which became "basci buzuk" in Italian), that was created in Eritrea by the Albanian adventurer Sagiak Hassan in the second half of the 19th century. In 1885, the Italian Colonel Tancredi Saletta, commanding officer of the first Italian troops involved in the conquest of Eritrea, enlisted Bashi-bazouks in the service of Italy.

Locally recruited bands were employed in the conquest of Italian Libya from 1911 to the 1930s. Their Somali counterparts played an important role in Italian Somaliland during the 1920s. During the guerrilla war that continued in Ethiopia after the 1936 Italian invasion, Banda were recruited amongst groups collaborating with the Italian regime.

While most  were recruited in the Italian colonies in Africa, many units bearing this designation were also created as auxiliaries during the Second World War in Albania and in the occupied territories of the former Kingdom of Yugoslavia. The other branches of the Italian armed forces and corps created .

After the fall of Asmara the group (reduced to just 176 soldiers) did guerrilla war for many months.

See also 
 Amedeo Guillet
 Dubats
 Eritrean Ascari
 Hamid Idriss Awate
 Zaptié
 Savari
 Italian Spahis
 Royal Corps of Colonial Troops (Italian)
 Ruga-Ruga, irregular troops in Eastern Africa, often deployed by western colonial forces.

Notes

Military history of Italy
Italian East Africa
Italian colonial troops